Alamid may refer to:

 Alamid (band), a Filipino rock band
 Asian palm civet, called alamid in Tagalog